The 1939–1940 Winter Offensive was one of the major engagements between the National Revolutionary Army and Imperial Japanese Army during the Second Sino-Japanese War, in which Chinese forces launched their first major counter-offensive on multiple fronts. Although this offensive failed to achieve its original objectives,  some studies have shown that it came as a heavy blow to the Japanese forces, as well as a massive shock to the Japanese military command, which did not expect the Chinese forces to be able to launch an offensive operation on such a large scale.

By April 1940, the Japanese army had successfully fought the operation to a halt. However, a Japanese counteroffensive in the northern theater failed to seize Ningxia and was defeated in Suiyuan by Chinese Muslim forces.

Strategic situation
The Chinese had repulsed two Japanese offensives in the summer at the Battle of Suixian-Zaoyang and in fall at the 1st Battle of Changsha. They believed that the Japanese forces were now too dissipated to take and hold new territory and would not be able to launch large offensives unless they received more reinforcements. However, by defending interior lines and with control of the lines of communication, they could still shift forces and launch local offensives to damage Chinese forces or mop up guerrillas in the rear areas. Additionally, during 1939, the Japanese were replacing many of their large four-regiment square Divisions with the smaller three regiment triangular Divisions and weak Independent Mixed Brigades. This weakening of forces encouraged the Chinese to plan a large offensive to exploit that fact.

Chinese plan
The Chinese objective in the offensive was to take the initiative by conducting multiple-front attacks to tie down the Japanese forces. They intended to use their position of exterior lines to advantage to prevent the Japanese from launching new local offensives or shifting their forces to concentrate for a large offensive. The main effort was to be by the 2nd, 3rd, 5th and 9th War Areas, which received all newly trained and reorganized units. Secondary efforts in support of the main efforts or as diversions were to be conducted by 1st, 4th, 8th, Shantung-Kiangsu and Hopei-Chahar War Areas with their existing units.

Results of the north China offensive 
Long-hsuen's "History of The Sino-Japanese War" then ends the narrative of the operation with the mention that supply difficulties greatly affected operations because of Communist raids in their rear area and instigation of revolts, which seized food and forbade it to be sold to the government forces. Despite this, the 40th Corps and 27th Corps accomplished their aim of pinning down the Japanese in the Chang-chih and Chang-tze area. However, in southwestern Shanxi, the main effort of 2nd War Area and of the whole North China offensive failed to seize the major towns on the railroad or Japanese strongpoints that were their objectives or to cut the Tungpu Railroad, except for the area between Wenxi and Anyi. At the end of the campaign, the 2nd War Area claimed that 13,770 Japanese killed or wounded. The 1st War Area reported that 5,130 Japanese killed, and seems to have accomplished its mission of tying down Japanese troops in its area of operations. The 8th War Area, after a see-saw campaign, had succeeded in rolling the Japanese back to Baotou in the Battle of Wuyuan. Guerriila forces in the Hopei-Chahar and Shangtung-Kwangtung War Area carried out attacks but apparently without decisive results, and in the Shangtung peninsula they received a serious counterattack.

In 1937, the Chinese government picked up intelligence that the Japanese planned to install a puppet Hui Muslim regime around Suiyuan and Ningxia, and had sent agents to the region. The Middlesboro Daily News ran an article by Owen Lattimore which reported on Japan's planned offensive into the Muslim region in 1938, which predicted that the Japanese would suffer a crushing defeat at the hands of the Muslims.

The Japanese planned to invade Ningxia from Suiyuan in 1939 and create a Hui Muslim puppet state. The next year, however, the Japanese were defeated by the Kuomintang Muslim Gen. Ma Hongbin, causing the plan to collapse. His Hui Muslim troops launched further attacks against Japan in the Battle of West Suiyuan.

In Suiyuan, 300 Mongol collaborators serving the Japanese were fought off by a single Muslim who held the rank of major at the Battle of Wulan Obo in April.

Muslim Generals Ma Hongkui and Ma Hongbin defended west Suiyuan, especially in Wuyuan, in 1940. Ma Hongbin commanded the 81st Corps, which suffered heavy casualties, but they eventually repulsed the Japanese and defeated them.

Japan made heavy use of chemical weapons against China to make up for lack of numbers in combat and because China did not have any poison gas stockpiles of its own to retaliate. Japan also used poison gas against Chinese Muslim armies at the Battle of Wuyuan and Battle of West Suiyuan.

Results of the central China offensive 
River North Army accomplished little and was driven back behind the river by December 23,  freeing up 13th Division units for use elsewhere. The Japanese held Right Flank Army in the Zhongxiang area far from the planned stop line from Xinshi to Songhe and Pingba.  The Japanese contained Left Flank Army or (River East Army) far from its final objectives. Southern Honan Army did attack the enemy 3rd Division in the area north of Yingshan and Xishuanghe and send a strong force to cut enemy lines of communications in the area of Guangshui and Xinyang.  Its main force was to attack in the area of Xinyang and occupy it. Neither of these objectives was achieved despite the commitment of the 31st Army Group. Eastern Hupei Guerrilla force did not advance to the enemy rear areas at Guangshui, Huayuan and Hankow to check enemy movement along the railroad. They never got near those objectives, leaving the Japanese free to move troops along the rails to meet the other attacks.

The Chinese Muslim General Ma Biao led Hui Muslim, Salar Muslim, and Dongxiang Muslim cavalry to annihilate the Japanese at the Battle of Huaiyang.

Chinese winter offensive in Kwangtung 
After routing the Japanese force coming from Longxian on January 1, the 54th Corps recaptured that town on the 2nd.  Guandu fell on the 4th and Qingtang on January 5.  The Japanese retreated to Shatien while 54th Corps advanced southwest to Shijiao.  On January 3 the 2nd Provisional Corps laid siege to Yingde and took it on the 5th.  It then continued to advance to Lianjiangkou while Japanese remnants fled southwest and took Qingcheng on the north bank of the Lien River, linking up with Japanese forces across the river to the south.  Subsequently, portions of 64th Corps and 2nd Provisional Corps recovered Qingcheng on January 10. Across the river the next day 14th Division of 54th Corps recovered Pajiangkou and to the east Conghua fell to the detachment of 35th Army Group. Yuantan along the Canton Hankow Railway fell the following day.  Yinzhan'ao fell on January 16.

The Main force of 35th Army Group moved along the west bank of the North River near Chiang-hsin, and 54th Corps and a portion of 12th Army Group moved to take up positions at Heng-shih, Liangkou, Lutien and Meikang. 4th War Area reported more than 10,300 enemy killed, 100 rifles and large amount of supplies captured.

However, with the restricted frontage, and reinforcements sent from Central China the Japanese were able to shift forces to relieve their forces in South Guangxi.

References

External links
  Upper half of Map 19 showing the Winter offensive 1939-1940 in North China. Map 19, from Hsu Long-hsuen and Chang Ming-kai, History of The Sino-Japanese War (1937-1945) 2nd Ed. ,1971. 
  Lower half of map 19 showing the Winter offensive 1939-1940 in Central and South China from Hsu Long-hsuen and Chang Ming-kai, History of The Sino-Japanese War (1937-1945) 2nd Ed. ,1971.

Winter Offensive
Winter Offensive
Battles involving Mengjiang
1939-40 Winter Offensive
1939 in China
1940 in China
1939 in Japan
1940 in Japan